Brachychaeta is a genus of bristle flies in the family Tachinidae. There are at least two described species in Brachychaeta.

Species
These two species belong to the genus Brachychaeta:
 Brachychaeta petiolata Mesnil, 1953 c g
 Brachychaeta strigata (Meigen, 1824) c g
Data sources: i = ITIS, c = Catalogue of Life, g = GBIF, b = Bugguide.net

References

Further reading

External links

 
 

Tachinidae